The 	rufescent flycatcher (Myiophobus rufescens) is a species of bird in the family Tyrannidae. It is found in western Peru and northern Chile. Its natural habitat is subtropical or tropical moist montane forests.

References

Myiophobus
Birds of Chile
Birds of Peru
Birds described in 1864
Taxa named by Tommaso Salvadori